Neale House may refer to:

William P. Neale House, Woodburn, Kentucky, listed on the NRHP in Warren County, Kentucky
George Neale Jr. House, Parkersburg, West Virginia, listed on the NRHP in Wood County, West Virginia

See also
Neal House (disambiguation)
O'Neal House (disambiguation)